Günther Erich Enescu (born 25 November 1955) is a retired Romanian volleyball player who won a bronze medal at the 1980 Olympics. Günther was born on 25 November, 1955, in Bazna, Romania.

References

1955 births
Living people
Romanian men's volleyball players
Olympic volleyball players of Romania
Volleyball players at the 1980 Summer Olympics
Olympic bronze medalists for Romania
Olympic medalists in volleyball
Medalists at the 1980 Summer Olympics
20th-century Romanian people